Wales is one of the four countries of the United Kingdom.

Wales may also refer to:

Places

United Kingdom
 Wales (European Parliament constituency)
 Wales, Somerset, a hamlet in England
 Wales, South Yorkshire, a village and civil parish in England
 Principality of Wales (1215–1542)

Canada
 Wales, Ontario, a ghost town
 Wales Island (British Columbia)
 Wales Island (Nunavut)
 Wales Island (Ungava)

United States
 Wales, Alaska, a town
 Wales, Maine, a town
 Wales, Massachusetts, a town
 Wales Township, Michigan, a civil township
 Wales, New York, a town
 Wales, North Dakota, a city
 Wales, Utah, a town
 Wales, Wisconsin, a village

Other uses
 Wales (surname)
 Wales (magazine), a literary journal edited by Keidrych Rhys, published 1937–1959

See also
 Prince of Wales (disambiguation)
 Princess of Wales
 Gerald of Wales ( – ), a medieval clergyman and chronicler
 Maud of Wales (1869–1938), Queen of Norway
 Wale (disambiguation)